CJPL-FM is a First Nations community radio station that operates at 17 watts on 89.9 FM in Postville, Newfoundland and Labrador, Canada.

The station was licensed in 1987.

References

External links

Jpl